Esteban Damián Mascareña Sánchez (born July 12, 1995) is a Uruguayan professional footballer who plays as a centre-back for Samtredia in the Erovnuli Liga.

Club career
Mascareña started his career playing with River Plate. He made his professional debut during the 2015/16 season.

References

1995 births
Living people
Uruguayan footballers
Association football midfielders
Club Atlético River Plate (Montevideo) players
Uruguayan Primera División players
Tercera División players
Uruguayan expatriate footballers
Uruguayan expatriate sportspeople in Spain
Expatriate footballers in Spain